The 2016 Sparkassen ATP Challenger was a professional tennis tournament played on indoor hard courts in Ortisei, Italy between 7 and 13 November 2016. It was the seventh edition of the tournament which was part of the 2016 ATP Challenger Tour.

Singles main-draw entrants

Seeds

 1 Rankings are as of October 31, 2016.

Other entrants
The following players received wildcards into the singles main draw:
  Patrick Prader
  Matteo Berrettini
  Salvatore Caruso
  Gianluca Mager

The following player received entry into the singles main draw using a protected ranking:
  Albano Olivetti

The following player received entry into the singles main draw as a special exempt:
  Kevin Krawietz

The following players received entry from the qualifying draw:
  Julien Dubail
  Yannick Jankovits
  Andriej Kapaś
  Michał Przysiężny

The following player received entry as a lucky loser:
  Nino Serdarušić

Champions

Singles

 Stefano Napolitano def.  Alessandro Giannessi 6–4, 6–1.

Doubles

 Kevin Krawietz /  Albano Olivetti def.  Frank Dancevic /  Marko Tepavac, 6–4, 6–4.

External links
Official Website

Sparkassen ATP Challenger
Internazionali Tennis Val Gardena Südtirol
2016 in Italian tennis